Wrestling at the Friendship Games was contested in three disciplines: freestyle, Greco-Roman and sambo wrestling. Freestyle events took place at the Winter Sports Palace in Sofia, Bulgaria between 20 July and 22 July 1984 (with 80 competitors in 10 events). Greco-Roman events were contested at the Budapest Sportcsarnok in Budapest, Hungary between 13 and 15 July 1984 (with 61 competitors in 10 events). Sambo took part in Ulaanbaatar, Mongolia between 1 and 2 September 1984.

Medal summary

Freestyle

Greco-Roman

Sambo

Medal table

Counting freestyle and Greco-Roman events only.

See also

 Wrestling at the 1984 Summer Olympics

References

Friendship Games
1984 in sport wrestling
1984 in Bulgarian sport
1984 in Hungarian sport
Friendship Games
International wrestling competitions hosted by Bulgaria
International wrestling competitions hosted by Hungary